Jonathan Eddolls (born 1 February 1981) is a British Formula One engineer. He is currently the head of trackside engineering at the Scuderia AlphaTauri Formula One team.

Career
Eddolls studied mechanical engineering at university, before landing a summer internship at Williams Racing. Eddolls greatly impressed the Grove outfit, so was offered a full time position as a graduate engineer where he rotated between departments. Eventually Eddolls focused on data and performance engineering becoming Rubens Barrichello's data engineer for 2010-2011 and then provided the same role to Bruno Senna. In 2013 he was promoted to race engineer to Valtteri Bottas and although their first season was disappointing, they proved to be a great team from 2014 to 2016 as Bottas recorded multiple podiums and finished in the top six in both 2014 and 2015. In 2017 Eddolls left Williams for Toro Rosso to seek a new challenge as head of trackside engineering, a position he holds today as the team as evolved into Scuderia AlphaTauri. His current role consists of extracting the maximum performance out of both cars on any given weekend; working closely with the engineering teams on both sides of the AlphaTauri garage and the performance groups back in Faenza.

References

Living people
British motorsport people
Formula One engineers
1981 births